Soft Khichuri, also known as Norom Kisuri is one kind of rice-based meal which is similar in consistency to porridge, a popular dish in the Sylhet region of Bangladesh. It is a traditional food in Sylheti cuisine that is served most dinner tables during the holy month of Ramadan. Being a staple  food for iftar, Soft Khichuri at home and Akhni for serving the guest is a tradition of Sylhet. Aromatic rice mixing with various spices including ghee, kalozira and fenugreek to cook Kisuri.
There are two types of Soft Khichuri; white soft khichuri (jau/zau) and yellow soft khichuri (kisuri). Chana, Chickpea, piyaju, Bakarkhani, potato chops, egg chops, Beguni, vegetables and leaf pakora, Jalebi, Sharbat (rooh afza), phirni are the side dishes of Sylheti Iftar items. Among the sweetmeats, Sylhet's specialty is Imarti. It is specially made of without any food color for Iftari. Though it looks like jilapi, there is a difference between them in size and taste.

Ingredients 
Rice, dal, onions, ginger, a little amount of oil or butter, fenugreek and salt.

Procedure 
Rice and pulses should be cleaned properly for half an hour before cooking. Then in a pan, add rice, pulses, some onion and water with the rest of the ingredients. Some bay leaf also put there. When the water starts boiling, the fire should be lowered and remove the lid to make a gap. After a while, the lid is again covered stirring the mixture. The more stir, the more the rice will break and the mixture will be more delicious. At the end, add rest of the onion and fry them with oil or butter in a pan, mix well and put off the fire.

References

See also 
 Cuisine of Bangladesh
 White House Iftar dinner

Sylheti cuisine
Iftar foods
Rice dishes
Religious food and drink
Vegetarian cuisine